Sanja Rajović (born 18 May 1981) is a Serbian handballer who plays for the Croatian club ŽRK Izvor and the Serbian national team. Previously, she played for ŽRK Knjaz Miloš and ŽRK Kikinda. Rajović played for the Serbian national team at the 2012 European Handball Championship when the team finished 4th.

References

External links
EHF Profile

Living people
1981 births
People from Aranđelovac
Serbian female handball players
Serbian expatriate sportspeople in Croatia
Expatriate handball players
Mediterranean Games gold medalists for Serbia
Competitors at the 2013 Mediterranean Games
Mediterranean Games medalists in handball